Husthwaite Gate railway station is a disused railway station in North Yorkshire, England. It served the nearby village of Husthwaite.

When the Thirsk and Malton Line was completed in 1853, there was originally no station near Husthwaite. However, a single platform on the north side of the single line was provided by 1856, east of the crossing with the minor road from Husthwaite to Carlton Husthwaite, known as Elphin Bridge Lane. A stationmaster's house, incorporating the ticket office, was built on the opposite side of the crossing.

A goods siding in front of the stationmaster's house was built at the cost of Sir George Wombwell, a local landowner. In 1872, it was taken into public use and Wombwell's outlay was refunded. In 1880, a  tramway was built to connect the goods siding to Angram Wood, north east of the station. The gauge of the tramway is unknown.

This had risen to four trains a day by 1895.

The station was closed to passengers in January 1953, but the line was still used by long-distance passenger traffic and excursions. It remained as a goods station but became an unmanned delivery siding from October 1963. The station was closed in August 1964, having latterly been serviced with trains only from the east. An accident in March 1963 on the East Coast Main Line damaged Sessay Wood Junction and it was never repaired. The line was closed in 1964, and the track pulled up in the following year. A brick course of the platform remains. The stationmaster's house is a private dwelling, and the station sidings area is now a campsite.

References

Sources

External links
 Disused stations listing for Husthwaite Gate

Disused railway stations in North Yorkshire
Railway stations in Great Britain opened in 1856
Railway stations in Great Britain closed in 1953
Former North Eastern Railway (UK) stations